The Stade Thelbert Carti is an association football stadium in Quartier-d'Orleans, Saint Martin. It has a capacity of 2,500 spectators and an artificial turf surface. It is home to the Orléans Attackers FC of the Saint-Martin Senior League and has hosted matches of the Saint Martin national football team.

History
The reconstructed stadium was inaugurated in October 2016 after a four-month construction process. The football structures were almost completely destroyed by Hurricane Irma eleven months later. The Saint Martin government committed 500,000 euros to restoring the structure. In late 2021 a three-phase refurbishment plan was begun on the stadium with the installation of fence around the stadium, installing new lighting at the site, and laying a new synthetic coating on the playing surface. Phases two and three will include building a new athletics track, changing rooms, and bleachers, and a structure housing a dojo, fitness room, dance hall, yoga room, and social space.

References

External links
Soccerway profile

Football venues in Saint Martin